Raul Sagarbarria Roco (October 26, 1941 – August 5, 2005) was a political figure in the Philippines. He was the standard-bearer of Aksyon Demokratiko, which he founded in 1997 as a vehicle for his presidential bids in 1998 and 2004. He was a former senator and Secretary of the Department of Education under the presidency of Gloria Macapagal Arroyo. He had a strong following among young voters in the Philippines due to his efforts to promote honesty and good governance.

Early life and education

Raul Roco was born in Naga City in the Philippine province of Camarines Sur, the son of farmer Sulpicio Azuela Roco and public school teacher Rosario Orlanda Sagarbarria.

Roco finished elementary school at age 10 from Naga Parochial School, and high school at age 14 from Ateneo de Naga. He graduated magna cum laude from San Beda College (now San Beda University) in Manila with a degree in English in 1960. Then, he was also the Editor-in-Chief of The Bedan working with the likes of Rene Saguisag and Jaime Licauco. Later, Roco received a Bachelor of Laws degree (also at San Beda College) and was the college's Abbott Awardee for Over-All Excellence.  In the United States, he obtained his Master of Laws at the University of Pennsylvania, while also enrolled at the Wharton School.

He was the president of the National Union of Students of the Philippines in 1961 and was named one of the Ten Outstanding Students of the Philippines in 1964. His wife Sonia was the Most Outstanding Student that same year.

As a result of his various other achievements, he had been awarded seven honorary doctorates.

Political/professional career

After he passed the bar in 1965, Roco lobbied for the holding of a Constitutional Convention that aimed to amend the 1935 Philippine Constitution. He campaigned for a seat to represent his district in Camarines Sur. He won and thus became convention's youngest Bicolano delegate.

From 1983 to 1985, he served as president of the Integrated Bar of the Philippines.  While there, he was on the legal staff of the late Philippine Senator Benigno "Ninoy" Aquino, and he drafted the Study Now, Pay Later law.

Alongside his work in law, he has also served as a film producer.  In 1974, he was the executive producer of the late film director Lino Brocka's movie Tinimbang Ka Ngunit Kulang; this film won six FAMAS awards that year, including best film.

Among all legislators of the Eighth Congress of the Philippines (which lasted from 1987 to 1992), he was adjudged by the Ford Foundation and the University of the Philippines Institute of Strategic and Development Studies as first in over-all performance.

Senate
Roco was elected to the Senate in 1992 and 1995 serving until 2001, making many contributions that led many to recognize him as an "outstanding senator".  He wrote the law which reformed the nation's banking system; this earned him the title "Father of the Bangko Sentral". Some other laws that he wrote resulted in the liberalization of the banking industry and the strengthening of the thrift banks. In addition, he wrote the Intellectual Property Code and the Securities Regulation Code.

Roco has also made several contributions to education in the Philippines. He helped fund the teachers' cooperatives as well as the increment mandated by the Magna Carta for Public School Teachers for retiring public school teachers. On the students' side, he helped bring computers into Philippine universities, colleges, and public schools. In addition, he devised a plan for meal scholarships for poor students at the Philippine Normal University.

Roco wrote several bills targeted at protecting and prioritizing women in the Philippines. He wrote the Women in Nation Building Law, the Nursing Act, the Anti-Sexual Harassment Law, the Anti-Rape Law, and the Child and Family Courts Act. He also let women play major roles in the Department of Education's literacy program.  Out of thanks to his services for women, many women's groups named him an "Honorary Woman".

He also drafted a bill that abolished double taxation on Filipinos working abroad.

He was given the Bantay Katarungan award by Kilosbayan for playing an integral role in the Senate impeachment trial of then-president Joseph Estrada who was impeached by the House of Representatives on 2000 for graft and corruption, bribery, betrayal of public trust, and culpable violation of the 1987 Philippine Constitution. Unfortunately, the impeachment trial was not concluded and in 2001, Estrada was ousted from power by another People Power uprising.

As Secretary of Education
Roco took over as education secretary of the Philippines in 2001, at a time when the Philippines had not only one of the ten most corrupt governments in the world (according to Transparency International), but its Department of Education was also the fourth-most corrupt of its agencies (as named by the Asia Foundation - Social Weather Stations Survey of Enterprises on Public Sector Corruption). To combat this corruption, Roco imposed a department-wide transparency policy which also held employees accountable for the purchase of textbooks, which had been a major source of the department's corruption. This allowed the department to purchase textbooks for a much lower price, and after just eight months under Roco's leadership, the Department of Education gained a 73% public approval rating and became the most trusted government agency in the Philippines.

During his tenure in that position, Roco allowed free public education (through high school) as required by the Philippine Constitution. He also enacted a reform of basic education curriculum in order that children would focus their studies on reading, writing, arithmetic, science, and Makabayan. In addition, he made sure that teachers were paid promptly and ended the 3% "service fee" that the department had long been deducting from teachers' pay.

Candidacy for President

1998

Roco ran for president in the 1998 Philippine election. He lost to Vice-President Joseph Estrada but had a remarkable showing in a field of eleven candidates despite being an independent candidate. His strong showing was attributed to the widespread support he received from young Filipinos who eventually formed his party, Aksyon Demokratiko, and its youth arm, Aksyon Kabataan. Party leaders then included Jaime Galvez Tan, Lorna Patajo-Kapunan and Darwin Mariano.

2004

Roco rode his success in the Department of Education into a run for the Philippine presidency. His candidacy was based on his ability to fight corruption and to display fair play, decency, and honor.  His Aksyon Demokratiko party formed a coalition with Promdi and Reporma, the parties of 1998 presidential candidates Lito Osmeña and Renato de Villa, to form the Alyansa ng Pag-asa (Alliance of Hope).

Roco was a front-runner in pre-election surveys and was considered a strong contender. However, during the campaign, he battled with recurrence of his cancer,  after remission from his bout with prostate cancer in 1996. His illness forced him to leave the campaign trail for medical attention in the United States. Doctors told him that his condition was not life-threatening and that he could continue his run for the presidency. He returned to the campaign trail, but concerns about his illness greatly diminished his support.

He lost the election to the incumbent, Gloria Macapagal Arroyo, and finished fourth in a field of 5 candidates.

He was the President of Aksyon Demokratiko until his death.

Personal life 
Roco was married to Sonia Cubillo Malasarte from Bohol. They have six children (Robbie Pierre, Raul Jr., Sophia, Sareena, Rex and Synara)

Death

On 5 August 2005, Raul Roco died of prostate cancer, at St Luke's Medical Center in Quezon City. He was buried on August 11 in Naga City, Camarines Sur.

His widow, Sonia, lost her bid for Senator under the Genuine Opposition (formerly United Opposition) umbrella in the May 14, 2007 midterm elections. She still represents the party he started, Aksyon Demokratiko, in the hope of continuing the advocacies that her late husband had started.

See also

2004 Philippine general election
1998 Philippine general election

References

External links
 Official website
 Aksyon Demokratiko
 Biography at the Senate of the Philippines website
 Former senator Roco dies News of his death and obituary in the Philippine Inquirer
 Ex-senator Roco passes away (11.01 a.m.) News of his death in the Sunstar
Raul Roco succumbs to prostate cancer Article from ABS-CBN news
The grass will be greener the next day Article from INQ7.net
Malacañan: Roco a true patriot, freedom fighter Article from ABS-CBN with reactions from other Philippine politicians
Roco in search of Camelot Philippine Daily Inquirer article
A single photographic tribute to the great Late Senator Roco Aboard PR103 with Rob, Lyds and Ron Oania

|-

|-

|-

1941 births
2005 deaths
People from Naga, Camarines Sur
Bicolano people
Filipino Roman Catholics
Candidates in the 2004 Philippine presidential election
Candidates in the 1998 Philippine presidential election
Deaths from prostate cancer
Senators of the 11th Congress of the Philippines
Senators of the 10th Congress of the Philippines
Senators of the 9th Congress of the Philippines
Members of the House of Representatives of the Philippines from Camarines Sur
20th-century Filipino lawyers
Deaths from cancer in the Philippines
Bicolano politicians
Aksyon Demokratiko politicians
Laban ng Demokratikong Pilipino politicians
Secretaries of Education of the Philippines
University of Pennsylvania Law School alumni
San Beda University alumni
Arroyo administration cabinet members
Filipino political party founders